The arrondissement of Toul is an arrondissement of France in the Meurthe-et-Moselle department in the Grand Est region. It has 111 communes.

Composition

The communes of the arrondissement of Toul, and their INSEE codes, are:

 Aboncourt (54003)
 Aingeray (54007)
 Allain (54008)
 Allamps (54010)
 Andilly (54016)
 Ansauville (54019)
 Arnaville (54022)
 Avrainville (54034)
 Bagneux (54041)
 Barisey-au-Plain (54046)
 Barisey-la-Côte (54047)
 Battigny (54052)
 Bayonville-sur-Mad (54055)
 Beaumont (54057)
 Bernécourt (54063)
 Beuvezin (54068)
 Bicqueley (54073)
 Blénod-lès-Toul (54080)
 Bois-de-Haye (54557)
 Boucq (54086)
 Bouillonville (54087)
 Bouvron (54088)
 Bruley (54102)
 Bulligny (54105)
 Charey (54119)
 Charmes-la-Côte (54120)
 Chaudeney-sur-Moselle (54122)
 Choloy-Ménillot (54128)
 Colombey-les-Belles (54135)
 Courcelles (54140)
 Crépey (54143)
 Crézilles (54146)
 Dolcourt (54158)
 Domèvre-en-Haye (54160)
 Domgermain (54162)
 Dommartin-la-Chaussée (54166)
 Dommartin-lès-Toul (54167)
 Écrouves (54174)
 Essey-et-Maizerais (54182)
 Euvezin (54187)
 Favières (54189)
 Fécocourt (54190)
 Flirey (54200)
 Fontenoy-sur-Moselle (54202)
 Foug (54205)
 Francheville (54208)
 Gélaucourt (54218)
 Gémonville (54220)
 Germiny (54223)
 Gézoncourt (54225)
 Gibeaumeix (54226)
 Gondreville (54232)
 Grimonviller (54237)
 Griscourt (54239)
 Grosrouvres (54240)
 Gye (54242)
 Hamonville (54248)
 Jaillon (54272)
 Jaulny (54275)
 Lagney (54288)
 Laneuveville-derrière-Foug (54298)
 Lay-Saint-Remy (54306)
 Limey-Remenauville (54316)
 Lironville (54317)
 Liverdun (54318)
 Lucey (54327)
 Mamey (54340)
 Mandres-aux-Quatre-Tours (54343)
 Manoncourt-en-Woëvre (54346)
 Manonville (54348)
 Martincourt (54355)
 Ménil-la-Tour (54360)
 Minorville (54370)
 Mont-l'Étroit (54379)
 Mont-le-Vignoble (54380)
 Moutrot (54392)
 Noviant-aux-Prés (54404)
 Ochey (54405)
 Pagney-derrière-Barine (54414)
 Pannes (54416)
 Pierre-la-Treiche (54426)
 Pulney (54438)
 Rembercourt-sur-Mad (54453)
 Rogéville (54460)
 Rosières-en-Haye (54463)
 Royaumeix (54466)
 Saint-Baussant (54470)
 Sanzey (54492)
 Saulxerotte (54494)
 Saulxures-lès-Vannes (54496)
 Seicheprey (54499)
 Selaincourt (54500)
 Sexey-aux-Forges (54505)
 Thiaucourt-Regniéville (54518)
 Thuilley-aux-Groseilles (54523)
 Toul (54528)
 Tramont-Émy (54529)
 Tramont-Lassus (54530)
 Tramont-Saint-André (54531)
 Tremblecourt (54532)
 Trondes (54534)
 Uruffe (54538)
 Vandelainville (54544)
 Vandeléville (54545)
 Vannes-le-Châtel (54548)
 Viéville-en-Haye (54564)
 Vilcey-sur-Trey (54566)
 Villers-en-Haye (54573)
 Villey-le-Sec (54583)
 Villey-Saint-Étienne (54584)
 Xammes (54594)

History

The arrondissement of Toul was created as part of the department Meurthe in 1800, and became part of the department Meurthe-et-Moselle in 1871. It was disbanded in 1926, and restored in 1943.

As a result of the reorganisation of the cantons of France which came into effect in 2015, the borders of the cantons are no longer related to the borders of the arrondissements. The cantons of the arrondissement of Toul were, as of January 2015:
 Colombey-les-Belles
 Domèvre-en-Haye
 Thiaucourt-Regniéville
 Toul-Nord
 Toul-Sud

References

Toul